During George H. W. Bush's term in office as the president of the United States of America, he nominated 11 individuals for 10 different federal appellate judgeships who were not processed by the Democratic-controlled Senate Judiciary Committee. The Republicans claim that Senate Democrats of the 102nd Congress on purpose tried to keep open particular judgeships as a political maneuver to allow a future Democratic president to fill them.  All 10 of the judgeships were eventually filled with Clinton nominees, although one nominee, Roger Gregory, was nominated by Clinton and then renominated by President George W. Bush.  None of the nominees were nominated after July 1, 1992, the traditional start date of the unofficial Thurmond Rule during a presidential election year. Senator Orrin Hatch, the Republican leader of the Senate Judiciary Committee during the 106th Congress mentioned the controversy over President George H.W. Bush's court of appeals nominees during the following controversy involving the confirmation of any more Democratic court of appeals nominees during the last two years of President Bill Clinton's second term.

List of unsuccessful federal judicial nominations
Bush made 56 nominations for federal judgeships that were not confirmed by the Senate. All 56 expired at an adjournment of the Senate, including 53 that were pending at the close of the 102nd Congress. Twenty of his unsuccessful nominees were subsequently nominated to federal judgeships by other presidents, and 18 of them were confirmed.

Failed appellate nominees
United States Court of Appeals for the Third Circuit
Pennsylvania seat - Franklin Stuart Van Antwerpen (judgeship later filled by Clinton nominee Theodore McKee) (Van Antwerpen later was nominated to a different Third Circuit seat by President George W. Bush in 2003, confirmed in 2004 and assumed senior status in 2006)
Pennsylvania seat - Jay Waldman (judgeship later filled by Clinton nominee H. Lee Sarokin)
United States Court of Appeals for the Fourth Circuit
North Carolina seat - Terrence Boyle (judgeship later filled by Clinton nominee Roger Gregory of Virginia after being renominated by Bush in 2001) (Boyle was renominated to a different seat on the Fourth Circuit by President George W. Bush but was never confirmed)
Virginia seat - Lillian BeVier (judgeship later filled by Clinton nominee Diana Jane Gribbon Motz)
United States Court of Appeals for the Fifth Circuit
Texas seat - Sidney A. Fitzwater (judgeship later filled by Clinton nominee Fortunato Benavides)
United States Court of Appeals for the Sixth Circuit
Michigan seat - John Smietanka (judgeship later filled by Clinton nominee Martha Craig Daughtrey of Tennessee)
Ohio seat - Justin Wilson of Tennessee (judgeship later filled by Clinton nominee Karen Nelson Moore of Ohio, while the then-vacant and newly created Tennessee seat was eventually filled by Clinton nominee Martha Craig Daughtrey)
United States Court of Appeals for the Tenth Circuit
Oklahoma seat - Frank Keating (judgeship later filled by Clinton nominee Robert Harlan Henry)
United States Court of Appeals for the Eleventh Circuit
Florida seat - Kenneth Ryskamp, followed by Federico A. Moreno (judgeship later filled by Clinton nominee Rosemary Barkett)
United States Court of Appeals for the District of Columbia
John Roberts (judgeship later filled by Clinton nominee Judith Ann Wilson Rogers) (Roberts was renominated and confirmed to a different seat on the D.C. Circuit under President George W. Bush; later, he was nominated and confirmed as the Chief Justice of the United States under George W. Bush)

See also
 George H. W. Bush Supreme Court candidates
 United States federal judge
 Judicial appointment history for United States federal courts
 Deaths of United States federal judges in active service

References

judicial appointments
Bush, George H. W.